The Faculty of Communication of Pontevedra is a Spanish faculty of communication founded in 1993 in Pontevedra and based in the A Xunqueira campus.

History 
The Faculty of Social Sciences of Pontevedra, which is the origin of the current Faculty of Communication, was created by Decree 192/1993, of 29 July, in its article 19. The degree in Advertising and Public relations, the only one in the Galician university system, was the first to be implemented in the Faculty. The dean-commissioner who drew up the programme for the new degree was Alejandro Pizarroso Quintero, professor at the Faculty of Information Sciences of the Complutense University of Madrid. The programme was approved on 1 July 1994.

The Faculty of Social Sciences began operating in Pontevedra on 10 October 1994 in a temporary building, the former Provincial Hospice in Sierra Street, where it remained until 2000, when the new large Faculty building built on the A Xunqueira Campus, designed by the Santiago de Compostela architect José Carlos Arrojo Lois, began its activities.

In 1999, by Decree 250/1999 of 9 September, Article 4, management and public administration studies were proposed as a second university degree to be obtained in the college.

In May 2003, the faculty was allowed to offer a degree in audiovisual communication and the name of the faculty was changed from Social Sciences to Faculty of Social Sciences and Communication.

On 7 July 2022, by Decree 133/2022, the Faculty of Management and Public Leadership was created on the Pontevedra campus, and the degree in Management and Public Leadership is now offered in this faculty.

On 29 December 2022, by Decree 230/2022 of the Regional Ministry of Education, the faculty was renamed Faculty of Communication.

Programmes

Undergraduate 
 Bachelor's degree in advertising and public relations.
 Bachelor's degree in audiovisual communication.

Postgraduate 
The Faculty offers the following master's degrees:
 Master's degree in art direction in advertising.
 Master's degree in social media communication and digital content creation.

The Faculty also offers a PhD in communication, approved by the University Council.

Facilities 
The central library of the Pontevedra campus is located on the first floor of the faculty. The building has two radio studios and two sets (television and cinema). It also has a Pro Tools room, where a professional demo can be shot, twelve Avid editing booths and several computer rooms.

Deanery staff 
The Dean of the Faculty is Xosé Manuel Baamonde Silva, and the Vice Deans are José Pita, Xabier Martínez Rolán and Rosa Ricoy Casas. The secretary is Silvia García Mirón.

Culture 
At the end of April, the main festival on the Pontevedra campus, Santa Kata or Santa Catabirra, is dedicated to the patron saint of the Faculty of Communication, Saint Catherine of Siena. Thousands of young people from all over Galicia participate in this festival.

References

See also

Related articles 
 Faculty of Fine Arts of Pontevedra
 Pontevedra Campus

External links 
 Faculty website

Pontevedra Campus
Universities in Galicia (Spain)
Educational institutions established in 1993
1993 establishments in Spain
Education in Pontevedra